The 1925 Lippe state election was held on 18 January 1925 to elect the 21 members of the Landtag of the Free State of Lippe.

Results

References 

Lippe
Elections in North Rhine-Westphalia